Denaby Ings are a nature reserve on the River Dearne, encompassing an area of 23 hectares north of Denaby Main, Doncaster, South Yorkshire, near the town of Mexborough. The Trans Pennine Trail passes here. The habitats include open water, water meadows, woodland scrub and hedgerows. Birdwatching is a popular activity there. The area has been classed as a Site of Special Scientific Interest since 11 August 1983.

References

Geography of Doncaster
Nature reserves in South Yorkshire
Sites of Special Scientific Interest in South Yorkshire